Tabor Creek is a stream in Douglas and Howell counties in the Ozarks of southern Missouri.

The stream source area is located about six miles northwest of West Plains just north of Missouri Route 14. The stream flows southwest passing under Route 14 and on passing one mile south of the community of Grimmet. The stream then turns west and enters the Mark Twain National Forest and meanders west passing about one mile south of Siloam Springs. The stream turns northwest and enters the southeast corner of Douglas County and flows west to its confluence with Spring Creek about one half mile north of the Spring Creek's confluence with the North Fork River.

The stream was named for the Tabor family who moved into the area from Kentucky before the Civil War.

References

Rivers of Douglas County, Missouri
Rivers of Howell County, Missouri
Rivers of Missouri